Sam Grove-White (born 29 April 1992) is a professional rugby union referee who represents the Scottish Rugby Union.

Rugby playing career

Grove-White began playing rugby with Montrose minis and then Angus Colts. However when he was at university an injured ankle ended his playing career and he decided to start refereeing rugby union instead.

Rugby referee career

Professional career

Grove-White has refereed in the Japanese Top League in 2015 as part of a Scottish Rugby Union initiative to create links with Scotland and Japan.

He has also refereed in the Scottish Premiership.

Grove-White now referees in the Pro14.

He refereed his first game in the Super 6 in a match between Stirling County and Ayrshire Bulls.

International career

He was picked as a referee for the World Rugby Sevens Series of 2016-17 season. This has continued through to the 2018-19 season.

Grove-White has refereed in the Under 20 Six Nations.

He has also refereed in the 2018 Commonwealth Games.

He refereed in the 2 January 2021 1st round 1872 Cup match.

Outside of rugby

Grove-White has a degree in Business Management from Robert Gordon University.

References

External links
Sam Grove-White teaching refereeing to schoolchildren

1992 births
Living people
Scottish rugby union referees
Rugby union officials
United Rugby Championship referees
Super 6 referees
1872 Cup referees